Cappamore GAA is a Gaelic Athletic Association club located in the village of Cappamore in County Limerick, Ireland. The club is a member of the East Division of Limerick GAA. The main game played by the club is hurling, which has teams at all grades from under 6 to senior. Football is also played from under 6 to junior level. The club's colours are green and gold.

History
The club was founded in 1887. They were promoted back to senior grade in hurling in 2016, after reaching the Premier Intermediate Final.

Achievements
 Limerick Senior Hurling Championship Winners (5) 1904, 1954, 1956, 1959, 1964. Runners-Up (5) 1897, 1929, 1958, 1984, 1988
 Limerick Intermediate Hurling Championship Winners (1) 2015
 Limerick Junior Hurling Championship Winners (2) 1952, 2011
 Munster Junior Club Hurling Championship Runners-Up (1) 2011
 Limerick Under-21 Hurling Championship Winners (2) 2006, 2021
 Limerick Junior Football Championship Winners (2) 2004, 2012
 Munster Junior Club Football Championship Runners-Up (1) 2012

Notable players

 Liam Ryan, winning Limerick captain 1955
 John Hayes
 Pat Mulcahy

External links
 http://www.irishexaminer.com/sport/gaa/hurling/cappamore-club-anniversary-sparks-thoughts-of-better-times-192023.html

Gaelic games clubs in County Limerick
Hurling clubs in County Limerick
Gaelic football clubs in County Limerick